Kim Ji-soo (born February 5, 1990) is a South Korean singer-songwriter and musician.

Career
Born in Cheongju, Korea, Jisoo grew up listening to music of various musicians such as Kim Gun-mo and Jason Mraz
and majored music at Daebul University.  In 2010, he appeared on Superstar K2, a singing competition on M.net. During the competition, he got famous by singing 'Chocolate Drive' by Moida band and 'Cinderella' by Seo In-Young with Jaein Jang in an acoustic version.  He made to the 6th place. 
In 2011, Jisoo signed with his 1st recording label, Shofar music , and released his first extended play in the same year. 
In 2012, Jisoo portrayed Park Hong Joo, on Dream High Season 2, a television drama from KBS.
In 2012, Jisoo released his second extended play, and he wrote 5 out of 6 songs on it.

Discography

Studio albums

Extended plays

Singles

Soundtrack appearances

Awards and nominations

References

External links 
 

1990 births
Living people
South Korean pop singers
South Korean rhythm and blues singers
South Korean pop guitarists
South Korean male television actors
Superstar K participants
21st-century South Korean  male singers
21st-century guitarists
South Korean male singer-songwriters